HMS Turpin (pennant number P354) was one a group three T-class submarines of the Royal Navy which entered service in the last few months of World War II. So far she has been the only ship of the Royal Navy to be named Turpin.  She was sold to Israel in 1965 and commissioned into the Israeli Sea Corps in 1967 as INS Leviathan.

Construction
Turpin was laid down at Chatham Dockyard on 24 May 1943, was launched on 5 August 1944 and completed on 18 December 1944 (although she had already been commissioned on 1 October that year). Turpin was a Group 3 T-class submarine, of all-welded construction.

Career

As HMS Turpin

At the end of the war, all surviving Group 1 and Group 2 boats were scrapped, but the group 3 boats (which were of welded rather than riveted construction) were retained and fitted with snort masts. In 1955, Turpin was inside the arctic circle on an ELINT mission, listening for specific frequency bands of Soviet radars. Suddenly, the ELINT specialist noted an unusual signal that was from a very short range radar. The operator registered that they were about to be rammed by a Soviet Navy surface vessel, and a crash dive was ordered. The Turpin submerged below a cold water line which allowed them to evade Soviet sonar and escape.

Turpin was sold to the Israeli Navy in 1965, and renamed Leviathan, after a biblical sea monster.

As INS Leviathan

The submarine was purchased by Israel, along with two of her T-class sisters, in 1965, HMS Truncheon and HMS Totem.  She was commissioned into the Israeli Sea Corps in 1967.

She was eventually scrapped in 1978. A Dolphin class submarine named Leviathan was commissioned in 2000 to the Israeli Navy.

Footnotes

 
 
 
 
 

 

British T-class submarines of the Royal Navy
Ships built in Chatham
1943 ships
World War II submarines of the United Kingdom
Cold War submarines of the United Kingdom
British T-class submarines of the Israeli Navy